Paederini is a tribe of rove beetles.

Subtribes

 Acanthoglossina
 Astenina
 Cryptobiina
 Cylindroxystina
 Dolicaonina
 Echiasterina
 Lathrobiina
 Medonina
 Paederina
 Scopaeina
 Stilicina
 Stilicopsina

Genera
These 28 genera belong to the tribe Paederini:

 Acalophaena Sharp, 1886 g b
 Achenomorphus Motschoulsky, 1858 g b
 Astenus Dejean, 1833 c g b
 Biocrypta Casey, 1905 g b
 Dacnochilus Leconte, 1861 g b
 Echiaster Erichson, 1839 c g b
 Eustilicus Sharp, 1886 g b
 Homaeotarsus Hochhuth, 1851 c g b
 Lathrobium (Tetartoppeus) convolutum Watrous, 1980 i c g b
 Lissobiops Casey, 1905 b
 Lithocharis Dejean, 1833 i c g b
 Lobrathium Mulsant & Rey, 1878 c g b
 Medon (Platymedon) truncatum Hatch, 1957 i c g b
 Megastilicus Casey, 1889 g b
 Myrmecosaurus Wasmann, 1909 g b
 Ochthephilum Stephens, 1829 c g b
 Orus Casey, 1885 g b
 Pachystilicus Casey, 1905 g b
 Paederus ( Harpopaederus ) xui Peng & Li c g b
 Pseudolathra Casey, 1905 g b
 Rugilus Leach, 1819 c g b
 Scopaeus Erichson, 1839 c g b
 Sphaeronum Sharp, 1876 g b
 Stamnoderus Sharp, 1886 g b
 Stilicopsis Sachse, 1852 g b
 Sunius Stephens, 1829 i c g b
 Tetartopeus Czwalina, 1888 g b
 Thinocharis Kraatz, 1859 c g b

Data sources: i = ITIS, c = Catalogue of Life, g = GBIF, b = Bugguide.net

References

Polyphaga tribes
Paederinae